This is a selective list of the works of Malcolm Arnold, listed by genre.

Ballets
Homage to the Queen (Op. 42, 1953; choreography by Frederick Ashton)
Rinaldo and Armida (Op. 49, 1954; choreography by Ashton)
Solitaire (1956; based on the English Dances, choreography by Kenneth MacMillan)
Sweeney Todd (Op. 68, 1959; choreography by John Cranko)
Electra (Op. 79, 1963; choreography by Robert Helpmann)
The Three Musketeers (ballet) (2006; arranged from Arnold's other music; choreography by David Nixon)

Orchestral
Symphonies
Symphony for Strings (Op. 13, 1946)
Symphony No. 1 (Op. 22, 1949)
Symphony No. 2 (Op. 40, 1953)
Toy Symphony, Op. 62 (1957)
Symphony No. 3 (Op. 63, 1957)
Symphony No. 4 (Op. 71, 1960)
Symphony No. 5 (Op. 74, 1961)
Symphony No. 6 (Op. 95, 1967)
Symphony No. 7 (Op. 113, 1973)
Symphony No. 8 (Op. 124, 1978)
Symphony No. 9 (Op. 128, 1986)
Dance Suites
English Dances, Set 1, Op. 27 (1950)
English Dances, Set 2, Op. 33 (1951)
Four Scottish Dances, Op. 59 (1957)
Four Cornish Dances, Op. 91 (1966)
Four Irish Dances, Op. 126 (1986)
Four Welsh Dances, Op. 138 (1988)
Overtures
Comedy Overture: Beckus the Dandipratt, Op. 5 (1943)
The Smoke (Overture), Op. 21 (1948)
A Sussex Overture, Op. 31 (1951)
Tam o' Shanter Overture, Op. 51 (1955)
A Grand, Grand Overture, Op. 57 (1956)
Commonwealth Christmas Overture, Op. 64 (1957)
Sunshine Overture, Op. 83 (1964)
Peterloo Overture, Op. 97 (1968)
Anniversary Overture, Op. 99 (1968)
The Fairfield Overture, Op. 110 (1972)
Robert Kett Overture, Op. 141 (1988)
Sinfoniettas
Sinfonietta No. 1, Op. 48 (1954)
Sinfonietta No. 2, Op. 65 (1958)
Sinfonietta No. 3, Op. 81 (1964)
Divertimentos
Divertimento No. 1, Op. 1 (1945)
Divertimento No. 2, Op. 24 (1950), revised as Op. 75 (1961)
Little Suites
Little Suite No. 1, Op. 53 (1955)
Little Suite No. 2, Op. 78 (1961)
Little Suite No. 3, Op. 142 (1990)
Little Suite No. 4, Op. 80a (1963)
Little Suite No. 5, Op. 93a (1957)
Miscellaneous
Larch Trees, Op. 3 (1943)
Symphonic Suite, Op. 12 (1945-46 – lost)
Serenade for Small Orchestra, Op. 26 (1950)
Symphonic Study Machines Op. 30 (1951)
Sarabande and Polka from Ballet 'Solitaire' (1956)
Sweeney Todd Concert Suite, Op. 68a (1959)
The Song of Simeon, Op. 69 (1959)
Carnival of Animals, Op. 72 (1960)
Grand Concerto Gastronomique, Op. 76 (1961), for eater, waiter, food and orchestra
Water Music, Op. 82 (1964)
Severn Bridge Variations (1966, part of a composite work composed by Arnold, Alun Hoddinott, Nicholas Maw, Daniel Jones, Grace Williams and Michael Tippett)
Padstow Lifeboat March, Op. 94 (1967)
Salute to Thomas Merritt, Op. 98 (1987)
Concerto for 28 players, Op. 105, (1970)
A Flourish For Orchestra, Op. 112 (1973)
Philharmonic Concerto, Op. 120 (1976)
Variations for Orchestra, Op. 122 (1977)
Suites from Film Music
The Bridge on the River Kwai concert suite (1957; orchestra)
The Inn of the Sixth Happiness (Suite) (1992)

Concerto
Concerto for Two Violins and String Orchestra, Op. 77 (1962)
Piano
Concerto for Piano Duet and Strings, Op. 32 (1951)
Concerto for Piano 3 Hands and Orchestra, Op. 104 (1969); better known as Concerto for Phyllis and Cyril)
Fantasy on a Theme of John Field for Piano and Orchestra, Op. 116 (1975)
Viola Concerto, Op. 108 (1971)
Cello Concerto Shakespearean, Op. 136 (1988)
Flute
Flute Concerto No. 1, Op. 45 (1954)
Flute Concerto No. 2, Op. 111 (1972)
Oboe Concerto, Op. 39 (1952)
Clarinet
Clarinet Concerto No. 1, Op. 20 (1948)
Clarinet Concerto No. 2, Op. 115 (1974)
Recorder
Recorder Concerto, Op. 133 (1988)
Theme and Variations: Fantasy for Recorder and String Orchestra, Op. 140 (1990)
Horn
Horn Concerto No. 1, Op. 11 (1945)
Horn Concerto No. 2, Op. 58 (1956)
Trumpet
Trumpet Concerto, Op. 125 (1982)
Guitar
Serenade for Guitar and Strings, Op. 50 (1955)
Guitar Concerto, Op. 67 (1959)
Organ Concerto, Op. 47 (1954)
Harmonica Concerto, Op. 46 (1954)

Opera
Henri Christophe (1949;  four acts – incomplete, 25 pages in full score) [Libretto: Joe Mendoza]
Up at the Villa (1951; one act - unfinished, preliminary sketches only) [Libretto: Joe Mendoza, after Robert Browning]
The Dancing Master, Op. 34 (1952; one act) [Libretto: Joe Mendoza after William Wycherley]
The Open Window, Op. 56 (1956; one act) [Libretto: Sidney Gilliat after H.H.Munro ("Saki")]

Vocal and choral
Laudate Dominum (Psalm 150) for choir and organ, Op. 25 (1950)
Two Ceremonial Psalms, Op. 35 (1952)
John Clare Cantata, Op. 52 (1955)
Song of Praise "John Clare", Op. 55 (1956)
Five Blake Songs, for contralto and strings, Op. 66 (1959)
The Song of Simeon, Op. 69 (1959)
Parasol (1960) – TV musical
Song of Freedom for choir and brass band, Op. 109 (1972)
The Return of Odysseus, Op. 119 (1976)

Chamber
Three or more players
Phantasy for String Quartet: Vita Abundans (1941)
Trio for Flute, Viola and Bassoon Op. 6 (1942)
Three Shanties for Woodwind Quintet, Op. 4 (1943)
Quintet for Flute, Violin, Viola, Horn and Bassoon, Op. 7 (1944)
String Quartet No. 1, Op. 23 (1949)
Divertimento for Flute, Oboe and Clarinet, Op. 37 (1952)
Piano Trio, Op. 54 (1956)
Oboe Quartet, Op. 61 (1957)
Quintet For Brass, Op. 73 (1961)
String Quartet No. 2, Op. 118 (1975)
Brass Quintet No. 2, Op. 132 (1987)
Two players
Duo for Flute and Viola, Op. 10 (1946)
Violin Sonata No. 1, Op. 15 (1947)
Viola Sonata, Op. 17 (1947)
Flute Sonatina, Op. 19 (1948)
Oboe Sonatina, Op. 28 (1951)
Clarinet Sonatina, Op. 29 (1951)
Recorder Sonatina, Op. 41 (1953)
Violin Sonata No. 2, Op. 43 (1953)
Fantasy for Flute and Clarinet (1960s)
Five pieces for Violin and Piano, Op. 84 (1965)
Duo for Two Cellos, Op. 85 (1964)
Fanfare For Louis (1970), for two trumpets
Flute Sonata, Op. 121 (1977)
Divertimento for Two Clarinets, Op. 135 (1988)
One player alone
Fantasy for Bassoon Op. 86 (1966)
Fantasy for Clarinet Op. 87 (1966)
Fantasy for Horn, Op. 88 (1966)
Fantasy for Flute Op. 89 (1966)
Fantasy for Oboe Op. 90 (1966)
Fantasy for Trumpet, Op. 100 (1969)
Fantasy for Trombone, Op. 101 (1969)
Fantasy for Tuba, Op. 102 (1969)
Fantasy for Guitar, Op. 107 (1971)
Fantasy for Harp, Op. 117 (1975)
Fantasy for Recorder, Op. 127 (1987)
Fantasy for Cello, Op. 130 (1987)

Piano
Haile Selassie - March for Piano (1936)
Allegro in E minor for Piano (1937)
Serenade in G for Piano (1937)
Theme and Variations for Piano (1937)
Three Piano Pieces (1937)
Children's Suite, Op. 16 (1947)
Day Dreams (1938)
Eight Children's Piano Pieces, Op. 36 (1952) (including no. 8, The Buccaneer)
Eight English Dances, Opp. 27, 33 (1950/51)
Hobson's Choice (1953)
Homage to the Queen (1953)
Prelude (1945)
Sarabande and Polka from Solitaire (1956)
Serenade for Piano (1937)
Sonata for Piano (1942)
The Buccaneer (1952)
Three Fantasies for Piano, Op. 129 (1986)
Three Piano Pieces (1937)
Three Piano Pieces (1943)
Two Bagatelles, Op. 18 (1947)
Two Piano Pieces (1941)
Variations on a Ukrainian Folk Song, Op. 9 (1944)

Band
Duke of Cambridge (march, composed for the centenary of the Royal Military School of Music), Op. 60 (1957)
Little Suites
Little Suite No 1 for Brass Band, (Prelude, Siciliano and Rondo) Op. 80 (1963) 
Little Suite No 2 for Brass Band, Op. 93 (1967)
Little Suite No 3 for Brass Band, Op. 131 (1987)
Fantasy for Brass Band, Op. 114 (1974)
Symphony for Brass Instruments, Op. 123 (1978)

Film scores (selection)
Arnold composed music for 62 feature films (plus several documentaries and TV work) including:
 The Sound Barrier (1952) (dir David Lean)
 Stolen Face (1952) (dir Terence Fisher)
 The Holly and the Ivy (1952) (dir George More O'Ferrall)
 The Captain's Paradise (1953) (dir Anthony Kimmins)
 Albert R.N. (1953) (dir Lewis Gilbert)
 Hobson's Choice (1954) (dir David Lean)
 You Know What Sailors Are (1954) (dir Ken Annakin)
 The Sleeping Tiger (1954) (dir Joseph Losey)
 The Belles of St Trinian's (1954) (dir Frank Launder)
 The Sea Shall Not Have Them (1954) (dir Lewis Gilbert)
 1984 (1956) (dir Michael Anderson)
 Trapeze (1956) (dir Carol Reed)
 The Bridge on the River Kwai (1957) (dir David Lean)
 The Roots of Heaven (1958) (dir John Huston)
 Dunkirk (1958) (dir Leslie Norman)
 The Inn of the Sixth Happiness (1958) (dir Mark Robson)
 The Key (1958) (dir Carol Reed)
 Tunes of Glory (1960) (dir Ronald Neame)
 Whistle Down The Wind (1961) (dir Bryan Forbes)
 No Love for Johnnie (1961) (dir Ralph Thomas)
 The Inspector (1962) (dir Philip Dunne)
 The Lion (1962) (dir Jack Cardiff)
 Nine Hours to Rama (1963) (dir Mark Robson)
 The Chalk Garden (1964) (dir Ronald Neame)
 The Heroes of Telemark (1965) (dir Anthony Mann)
 Sky West and Crooked (1966) (dir John Mills)
 The Reckoning (1969) (dir Jack Gold)
 David Copperfield (1969) (dir Delbert Mann)

 
Arnold, Malcolm